The Road to Klockrike (Swedish: Vägen till Klockrike) is a 1953 Swedish drama film directed by Gunnar Skoglund and starring Anders Ek, Edvin Adolphson and Annika Tretow. 

It was shot at the Centrumateljéerna Studios in Stockholm. The film's sets were designed by the art director Bibi Lindström. It is based on the 1848 novel The Road to Klockrike by Harry Martinson.

Cast

 Anders Ek as 	Bolle
 Edvin Adolphson as 	Rat trap maker
 Annika Tretow as 	Margot
 Margit Carlqvist as Inga
 Erik Strandmark as 	Hällman
 Naima Wifstrand as 	Waterhead's Mother
 Åke Claesson as 	Waterhead's Father
 Anders Henrikson as 	Vägdamm, tramp
 Stig Järrel as Axne, vagabonde
 Gösta Cederlund as 	Chief of police
 Kolbjörn Knudsen as 	Inga's father 
 Else-Marie Brandt as 	Emelie
 Hedvig Lindby as Lady
 Eva Wikman as Country Girl
 Elsa Prawitz as 	Dolly
 Gunnar Olsson as Ahlbom, cigar maker
 Olav Riégo as Quarry manager
 John Melin as 	'Skötsamma Grisen'
 Tom Walter as Vagabonde stealing watches
 Per-Axel Arosenius as 	Dollys vän på Amerikabåten
 Svea Holst as 	Kvarvarande kvinna i hamnen
 Uno Larsson as 	Luffe på landsfiskalskontoret 
 Ulf Johansson as 	Kvarvarande arbetslös svensk
 Karin Miller as 	Skrämd flicka på väg 
 Birger Sahlberg as Hamnvakt 
 Kenne Fant as 	Cagliostro 
 Tor Borong as Riding Police
 Göthe Grefbo as 	Emigrant
 Gösta Holmström as Policeman
 Birger Lensander as 	Police Assistant at the Port 
 Harry Martinson as Prisoner in Quarry 
 Rune Stylander as	Guard at the Quarry 
 Emy Storm as Flicka i blomsterhagen 
 Tor Isedal as Dancer at the Road Crossing
 Gunnel Wadner as 	Dancer at the Road Crossing
 Mille Schmidt as 	Dancer at the Road Crossing
 Stig Johanson as Dancer at the Road Crossing 
 Palle Granditsky as Dancer at the Road Crossing

References

Bibliography 
 Qvist, Per Olov & von Bagh, Peter. Guide to the Cinema of Sweden and Finland. Greenwood Publishing Group, 2000.

External links 
 

1953 films
Swedish drama films
1953 drama films
1950s Swedish-language films
Films directed by Gunnar Skoglund
Swedish black-and-white films
Films based on Swedish novels
1950s Swedish films